Jared McCann (born May 31, 1996) is a Canadian professional ice hockey forward currently playing for the Seattle Kraken of the National Hockey League (NHL). McCann was selected by the Vancouver Canucks in the first round (24th overall) of the 2014 NHL Entry Draft, McCann has previously played for the Canucks, Florida Panthers and Pittsburgh Penguins.

Early life 
McCann was born on May 31, 1996, in Stratford, Ontario, to construction company owners Erin and Matt McCann. He grew up with two older siblings, Justin and Jaimie, and an older half-brother named Jordan. Justin was adopted from Guatemala out of fears that pregnancy would exacerbate the symptoms of Erin's multiple sclerosis. The cold temperatures in Stratford meant that McCann spent his childhood playing ice hockey outside on frozen ponds. His favorite National Hockey League (NHL) team growing up was the Los Angeles Kings, because he "liked the colours and the name of the team". He played minor ice hockey with the London Jr. Knights of the Alliance Hockey league before joining the London Nationals of the Greater Ontario Junior Hockey League at the end of the 2011–12 season.

Playing career

Junior 
The Sault Ste. Marie Greyhounds of the Ontario Hockey League (OHL) selected McCann fourth overall in the 2012 OHL Priority Selection. In 64 games with his junior ice hockey team during the 2012–13 season, McCann scored 21 goals and recorded 23 assists. He and Sergey Tolchinsky were named co-recipients of the Greyhounds' 2013 Rookie of the Year Award, and McCann was also named to the OHL's Second All-Rookie Team. In Game 1 of that year's OHL playoffs, McCann was checked by Cameron Brace of the Owen Sound Attack. He was assisted off the ice and taken to the hospital in an ambulance, with worries about a neck injury or possible concussion. He was ultimately diagnosed with a concussion and severe case of whiplash, which kept him out of the lineup indefinitely, and Brace was given a five-game suspension for the play. The Greyhounds lost their series against the Attack in six games, with McCann unable to rejoin the team before their elimination.

McCann was also selected as a member of Team Ontario for the 2013 World U-17 Hockey Challenge. Following the 2012–13 season, McCann was named to Team Canada's National Men's Summer Under-18 team and he competed at the 2013 Ivan Hlinka Memorial Tournament to win the gold medal with Team Canada.

McCann was a top 2014 NHL Entry Draft prospect. After his selection by the Canucks (24th overall), he was signed to a three-year entry-level contract on July 24, 2014.

Professional

Vancouver Canucks (2015–2016) 
Following an impressive training camp, McCann was named to the Canucks' roster for the start of the 2015–16 season on October 5, 2015. He made his NHL debut on October 7, 2015, against the Calgary Flames. The following game, on October 10, he scored his first NHL goal against Jonas Hiller of the Calgary Flames in a 3–2 OT loss. He scored the first goal of the night. Alternate captain Daniel Sedin called it "a world-class shot." On November 1, 2015, the Canucks announced that McCann and fellow rookie Jake Virtanen would remain in the NHL beyond their nine-game tryout period.

His first career assist came on a Jannik Hansen goal, on November 4, 2015, in a 3–2 loss to the Pittsburgh Penguins.

Florida Panthers (2016–2019) 
On May 25, 2016, the Canucks traded him with a second and a fourth round pick in 2016 NHL Entry Draft to the Florida Panthers in exchange for Erik Gudbranson and a 2016 fifth-round pick.

McCann started the 2017–18 season with the Panthers with two goals and five points in his first seven games, playing in a bottom-six role.

On October 25, 2017, McCann was placed on Injury Reserve due to a lower body injury he received in a game against the Washington Capitals, on October 21, in which he recorded his fifth point for the 2017–18 season. McCann returned to action on November 4, in a 5–4 loss to the New York Rangers.

Pittsburgh Penguins (2019–2021) 

On February 1, 2019, McCann was traded to the Pittsburgh Penguins along with Nick Bjugstad in exchange for Derick Brassard, Riley Sheahan, a second- and fourth-round pick in 2019 and Minnesota's fourth-round pick in 2019.

On September 18, 2020, McCann signed a two-year, $5.88 million contract to remain with the Penguins.

On July 17, 2021, McCann was traded to the Toronto Maple Leafs in exchange for a seventh round pick and Filip Hållander, a former Penguins draft pick that had previously been traded to the Maple Leafs. McCann was expected by both Pittsburgh and Toronto to be an expansion draft casualty to the arriving Seattle Kraken; the Penguins used him to re-acquire Hållander and allow another player to be selected from their roster, while the Maple Leafs (who did not have enough space for a protection slot under expansion draft rules) acquired McCann for the purpose of enticing the Kraken to select him over Alexander Kerfoot.

Seattle Kraken (2021–present) 
On July 21, 2021, McCann was selected from the Maple Leafs at the 2021 NHL Expansion Draft by the Seattle Kraken. Upon joining the team, he deferred to Calle Järnkrok and changed his jersey number to 16. During the preseason, McCann played on the Kraken's top line in the centre position between Jaden Schwartz and Jordan Eberle. Although this line was expected to play together at the start of the 2021–22 season, McCann was placed on the NHL's COVID-19 protocol list prior to their season opener. He was cleared to play prior to the contest and he scored the second goal in Kraken franchise history while playing with Eberle and Schwartz. Despite this, the Kraken lost their home opener 4–3 to the Vegas Golden Knights on October 12. The line stayed together for the first four games before Schwartz was replaced with Alexander Wennberg. However, this was short-lived as he was re-added to the NHL's COVID-19 protocol list for 10 days. While in quarantine, he used resistance bands and a stationary bike to help stay in game shape. When he returned to the lineup on November 11, he was reunited with Schwartz and Eberle. By the end of December, McCann had tallied 12 goals and five assists to rank among the top three scorers for the Kraken. The two scorers above him were linemates Eberle (12g, 9a in 28 games) and Schwartz (6g, 14a). McCann's 1.86 goals per 60 minutes of play marked a new career high while his 2.78 points per 60 minutes ranked second of his career. 

This success was short-lived however as Schwartz underwent hand surgery in January and was replaced with Marcus Johansson. McCann eventually overtook Eberle for team lead in goals scored with his 15th of the season in mid-January. McCann eventually tallied his career-high 20th goal of the season in a 6–2 loss to the Toronto Maple Leafs on February 14. He scored another goal in his 400th career NHL game on February 21 while also leading the team in shots on goal, shot attempts, and individual shot quality. Shortly after this game, however, McCann was placed on injured reserve with an undisclosed upper-body injury. At the time of the injury, he had recorded a career-high 21 goals and 12 assists through 48 games. McCann missed three games to recover before rejoining the Kraken lineup on March 5 and playing 16:21 minutes of ice time in a 5–2 loss to the Washington Capitals. A few days later, McCann became the first player in franchise history to sign a contract extension with the team. On March 8, he signed a five-year contract extension with an average annual value of $5 million per year. Although the Kraken failed to qualify for the 2022 Stanley Cup playoffs, McCann had a career-best season with 27 goals and 23 assists for 50 points.

International play

On April 29, 2019, McCann was named to his first Team Canada roster for the 2019 IIHF World Championship held in Slovakia. McCann helped Canada progress through to the playoff rounds before losing the final to Finland to finish with the Silver Medal on May 26, 2019. He finished the tournament with 2 goals and 5 points in 10 games.

Career statistics

Regular season and playoffs

International

Awards and honours

References

External links
 

1996 births
Living people
Canadian ice hockey centres
Florida Panthers players
National Hockey League first-round draft picks
Ice hockey people from Ontario
Sportspeople from Stratford, Ontario
Pittsburgh Penguins players
Sault Ste. Marie Greyhounds players
Seattle Kraken players
Springfield Thunderbirds players
Vancouver Canucks draft picks
Vancouver Canucks players